Richard Lapp  was Archdeacon of Cork  from 1688 until 1690.

Lapp  was born in Bandon, County Cork and educated at Trinity College, Dublin. He held incumbencies at Templequinlan and Rathclarin. He  was also Prebendary of Templebryan in Ross Cathedral from 1686 to 1687; and Treasurer of Cork from 1687 to 1688.

References

Alumni of Trinity College Dublin
Archdeacons of Cork
17th-century English Anglican priests